Agnes Elizabeth Zawadzki (born July 31, 1994) is an American former competitive figure skater. She is the 2012 Rostelecom Cup bronze medalist and a two-time U.S. national bronze medalist (2012, 2013). As a junior, she was a two-time World Junior medalist (2010 silver, 2011 bronze) and the 2010 U.S. national junior champion.

Personal life 
Zawadzki's parents, originally from Gdańsk and southern Poland, moved to the United States in the early 1990s and divorced when she was three. After her father died when she was 10, her mother worked double shifts as a nanny and housekeeper to support her skating. She has an older brother, Bart.

Zawadzki attended Cheyenne Mountain High School, graduating in May 2012. She was the recipient of an outstanding academic achievement award signed by President George W. Bush. A poem she wrote in sixth grade was published in Anthology of Poetry by Young Americans. She also went to Chippewa Middle School in Des Plaines, Illinois. In autumn 2012, Zawadzki began studying at the University of Colorado Colorado Springs, majoring in psychology.

Career 
Agnes Zawadzki began skating at the age of 5 in the Chicago area. She also tried dance and gymnastics until deciding to concentrate on skating at the age of 10. While residing in Des Plaines, she was coached by David Santee for seven years, initially receiving group lessons at the Niles Ice Arena and later private lessons at the Oakton Ice Arena in Park Ridge.

Her least favorite jump is the triple loop.

After placing fourth at the novice level at the 2008 U.S. Nationals, she decided to contact coach Tom Zakrajsek. She moved to Colorado Springs, Colorado to train with him at the Olympic Training Center.

2009–10 season: Silver at World Junior Championships 
During the 2009–10 season, Zawadzki won the U.S. Junior national title. At the 2010 World Junior Championships, she captured the silver medal.

2010–11 season: Senior Grand Prix debut 
Ahead of the 2010–11 season, Zawadzki decided not to compete on the Junior Grand Prix circuit but to move directly to the senior level. She finished 6th at her debut event, Skate Canada, and 4th at Cup of Russia. She made her senior national debut at the 2011 U.S. Championships. She placed fourth in both the short and free program to claim the pewter medal. She won the bronze medal at the 2011 World Junior Championships.

2011–12 season: Bronze at U.S. Championships 
On June 3, 2011, Zawadzki announced a coaching change to David Santee and Christy Krall. She continued to train mainly in Colorado Springs, with Krall assisting with day-to-day coaching and spent about a week each month in Park Ridge with Santee who also traveled regularly to Colorado Springs.

In the 2011–12 season, Zawadzki's Grand Prix events were 2011 NHK Trophy and 2011 Cup of Russia. She won the short program at the 2012 U.S. Championships and placed seventh in the free program. Zawadzki finished third overall and won the bronze medal. She was assigned to the 2012 Four Continents and finished 6th. She was also named the first alternate for the 2012 Worlds.

2012–13 season 
Zawadzki sprained her sacroiliac joint during summer 2012. She won the gold medal at the 2012 U.S. International Classic. She won her first Grand Prix medal, bronze, at the 2012 Rostelecom Cup. Zawadzki won another bronze medal at the 2013 U.S. Championships. She then competed at the 2013 Four Continents and finished 8th.

2013–14 season 
Zawadzki placed fourth at the 2013 U.S. International Classic. On October 9, 2013, she switched back to Zakrajsek, with her training base remaining the World Arena Ice Hall in Colorado Springs. She received two GP assignments for the 2013–14 season. She placed 7th at the 2013 Cup of China and 6th in her next event, the 2013 Rostelecom Cup.

In June 2014, Zawadzki said she would not compete in the 2014–15 season.
She has since been presumably retired.

Programs

Competitive highlights 

GP: Grand Prix; JGP: Junior Grand Prix

2009–present

2004–2009

References

External links 

 
 Agnes Zawadzki at IceNetwork

1994 births
American female single skaters
Living people
American people of Polish descent
Sportspeople from Cook County, Illinois
World Junior Figure Skating Championships medalists
People from Niles, Illinois
21st-century American women